Matthew Davies (born 4 May 1981) is an English former competitive figure skater. He is a two-time British national champion (2002, 2004) in men's singles and reached the free skate at five ISU Championships – three European Championships and two World Junior Championships. He competed once at the World Championships but did not advance past the short program.

Programs

Competitive highlights 
GP: Grand Prix; JGP: Junior Grand Prix

References

External links
 

1981 births
British male single skaters
Living people
Sportspeople from Southampton